Founders' Memorial MRT station is a future underground Mass Rapid Transit station on the Thomson–East Coast line in Marina East planning area, Singapore. Construction began in 2019, and the station is scheduled to open in tandem with the Founders' Memorial in 2027. The station will be located within the Bay East Garden of Gardens by the Bay, next to the Founders' Memorial.

History
Founders' Memorial station was originally known as "Marina East" or "Gardens Bay East" in the conceptual plans since 2008. It was originally a reserved station and the facility building. In January 2019, the station was announced as "Founders' Memorial" and will open in 2027, in tandem with the Founders' Memorial.

Contract T302 for the conversion of the existing TEL facility building at Bay East Garden into a station was awarded to China Railway First Group Co., Ltd at a sum of S$242.4 million in June 2016. Construction commenced in 2019, with completion slated for 2027.

References

Proposed railway stations in Singapore
Mass Rapid Transit (Singapore) stations
Railway stations scheduled to open in 2027